Alserio is a comune (municipality) in the Province of Como in the Italian region Lombardy, located about  north of Milan and about  southeast of Como.

Alserio borders the following municipalities: Albavilla, Anzano del Parco, Monguzzo, Orsenigo.

Demographic evolution

References

Cities and towns in Lombardy
Articles which contain graphical timelines